Kids Baking Championship is a competitive reality baking program produced by Levity Entertainment Group for the Food Network. Each week, the children compete to make the best dish, and are judged on presentation, taste, and creativity. All nine seasons of the series have been hosted and judged by actress Valerie Bertinelli and baker Duff Goldman of Charm City Cakes. In 2018, the show enjoyed its highest ratings ever that also eclipsed Duff Goldman's earlier show, Ace of Cakes, as the highest rated series in the network's history.

Most seasons have had twelve contestants, while some have had as few as eight. In most seasons, the prizes awarded along with the title of 'Kids Baking Champion' have been $25,000 in cash and a feature in Food Network Magazine. Seasons two and three did not include the article, while in season one the winner received $10,000 and a full kitchen remodel for their parents' house instead of the $25,000; in addition, a re-creation of their winning cake was sold by Charm City Cakes.

The seventh season premiered on August 5, 2019. On November 19, 2020, it was announced that the ninth season would premiere on December 28, 2020. On November 18, 2021, it was announced that the tenth season would premiere on December 27, 2021.

Season 1

Contestants

Elimination table 

 (WINNER) This baker won the competition.
 (RUNNER-UP) This baker made it to the finale, and was in second place.
 (FINALIST) This baker was eliminated in the finals.
 (WIN) This baker won the baking challenge.
 (HIGH) Baker was one of the judges' favourite bakers that week, but didn't win.
 (IN) Baker got through to the next round.
 (LOW) Baker was one of the judges' least favourite bakers that week, but was not eliminated.
 (ELIM) This baker was eliminated from the championship.
: Jackson and Natalie were eliminated before the winner was announced.

Episodes

Season 2 
Ten talented young bakers compete for the title of Kids Baking Champion and $25,000. Duff Goldman and Valerie Bertinelli are the hosts and judges again.

Contestants

Elimination table 

 (WINNER) This baker won the competition.
 (RUNNER-UP) This baker made it to the finale, and was in second place.
 (WIN) This baker won the baking challenge.
 (HIGH) Baker was one of the judges' favorite bakers that week, but didn't win.
 (IN) Baker got through to the next round.
 (LOW) Baker was one of the judges' least favorite bakers that week, but was not eliminated.
 (ELIM) This baker was eliminated from the championship.

Episodes

Season 3

Contestants 
Source for first names, hometowns, and age:

Elimination table 

 (WINNER) This baker won the competition.
 (RUNNER-UP) This baker made it to the finale, and was in second place.
 (WIN) This baker won the baking challenge.
 (WIN) This baker was on the winning team of a team challenge.
 (HIGH) Baker was one of the judges' favorite bakers that week, but didn't win.
 (IN) Baker got through to the next round.
 (LOW) Baker was one of the judges' least favorite bakers that week, but was not eliminated.
 (ELIM) This baker was eliminated from the championship.

Episodes

Season 4

Contestants 
Source for names, age, and hometowns:

Elimination Table

 (WINNER) This baker won the competition.
 (RUNNER-UP) This baker made it to the finale, and was in second place.
 (WIN) This baker won the baking challenge.
 (WIN) This baker was on the winning team of a team challenge.
 (HIGH) Baker was one of the judges' favorite bakers that week, but didn't win.
 (IN) Baker got through to the next round.
 (LOW) Baker was one of the judges' least favorite bakers that week, but was not eliminated.
 (ELIM) This baker was eliminated from the championship.

Episodes

Season 5 

Nine talented young bakers compete for the title of Kids Baking Champion, $25,000 and a spot in Food Network Magazine. Duff Goldman and Valerie Bertinelli are the hosts and judges again.

Contestants

Elimination Table

 (WINNER) This baker won the competition.
 (RUNNER-UP) This baker made it to the finale, and was in second place.
 (WIN) This baker won the baking challenge.
 (HIGH) Baker was one of the judges' favorite bakers that week, but didn't win.
 (IN) Baker got through to the next round.
 (LOW) Baker was one of the judges' least favorite bakers that week, but was not eliminated.
 (ELIM) This baker was eliminated from the championship.

Episodes

Season 6

Twelve talented young bakers compete for the title of Kids Baking Champion, $25,000 and a spot in Food Network Magazine. Duff Goldman and Valerie Bertinelli are the hosts and judges again.

Contestants

Elimination Table

 (WINNER) This baker won the competition.
 (RUNNER-UP) This baker made it to the finale, and was in second place.
 (WIN) This baker won the baking challenge.
 (WIN) This baker was on the winning team of a team challenge.
 (HIGH) Baker was one of the judges' favorite bakers that week, but didn't win.
 (IN) Baker got through to the next round.
 (LOW) Baker was one of the judges' least favorite bakers that week, but was not eliminated.
 (ELIM) This baker was eliminated from the championship.

Episodes

Season 7

Aired August 5, 2019 - September 16, 2019. Nine talented young bakers compete for the title of Kids Baking Champion, $25,000 and a spot in Food Network Magazine. Duff Goldman and Valerie Bertinelli are the hosts and judges again.

Contestants

Elimination Table

 (WINNER) This baker won the competition.
 (RUNNER-UP) This baker made it to the finale, and was in second place.
 (WIN) This baker won the baking challenge.
 (WIN) This baker was on the winning team of a team challenge.
 (HIGH) Baker was one of the judges' favorite bakers that week, but didn't win.
 (IN) Baker got through to the next round.
 (LOW) Baker was one of the judges' least favorite bakers that week, but was not eliminated.
 (ELIM) This baker was eliminated from the championship.

Episodes

Season 8

Contestants

Elimination Table

 (WINNER) This baker won the competition.
 (RUNNER-UP) This baker made it to the finale, and was in second place.
 (WIN) This baker won the baking challenge.
 (HIGH) Baker was one of the judges' favorite bakers that week, but didn't win.
 (IN) Baker got through to the next round.
 (LOW) Baker was one of the judges' least favorite bakers that week, but was not eliminated.
 (ELIM) This baker was eliminated from the championship.

Episodes

Season 9

Contestants 
Ages stated are at time of filming.

Elimination Table

 (WINNER) This baker won the competition.
 (RUNNER-UP) This baker made it to the finale, and was in second place.
 (WIN) This baker won the baking challenge.
 (WIN) This baker was on the winning team of a team challenge.
 (HIGH) Baker was one of the judges' favorite bakers that week, but didn't win.
 (IN) Baker got through to the next round.
 (LOW) Baker was one of the judges' least favorite bakers that week, but was not eliminated.
 (ELIM) This baker was eliminated from the championship.

Episodes

Season 10 
12 talented young bakers compete for the title of Kids Baking Champion and $25,000. Duff Goldman and Valerie Bertinelli are the hosts and judges again.

Contestants 
Ages stated are at time of filming.

Elimination Table

 (WINNER) This baker won the competition.
 (RUNNER-UP) This baker made it to the finale, and was in second place.
 (WIN) This baker won the baking challenge.
 (WIN) This baker was on the winning team of a team challenge.
 (HIGH) Baker was one of the judges' favorite bakers that week, but didn't win.
 (IN) Baker got through to the next round.
 (LOW) Baker was one of the judges' least favorite bakers that week, but was not eliminated.
 (ELIM) This baker was eliminated from the championship.

Episodes

Season 11 
12 talented young bakers compete for the title of Kids Baking Champion and $25,000. Duff Goldman and Valerie Bertinelli are the hosts and judges again.

Contestants 
Ages stated are at time of filming.

Elimination Table

 (WINNER) This baker won the competition.
 (RUNNER-UP) This baker made it to the finale, and was in second place.
 (WIN) This baker won the baking challenge.
 (WIN) This baker was on the winning team of a team challenge.
 (HIGH) Baker was one of the judges' favorite bakers that week, but didn't win.
 (IN) Baker got through to the next round.
 (LOW) Baker was one of the judges' least favorite bakers that week, but was not eliminated.
 (ELIM) This baker was eliminated from the championship.

Episodes

Kids Halloween Baking Championship
A special Halloween edition aired October 5, 2016. Food Network chef Duff Goldman and actress Alison Sweeney served at the competition as judges. The contestants were four child bakers who had previously competed on Kids Baking Championship.

Contestants

References

External links 
 

2015 American television series debuts
2010s American cooking television series
2020s American cooking television series
American television spin-offs
Food Network original programming
Food reality television series
Reality television spin-offs
English-language television shows
Television series about children
Television series about teenagers